Pipo Carlomagno (born 13 August 1993) is an Argentinian Paralympic swimmer who represented Argentina at the Paralympic Games.

Career
Carlomagno represented Argentina in the men's 100 metre backstroke S7 event at the 2020 Summer Paralympics and won a silver medal.

Personal life
His father, Fernando, represented Argentina in swimming and competed at the Paralympic Games in 1996, 2000 and 2004.

References

1993 births
Living people
Paralympic swimmers of Argentina
Medalists at the 2011 Parapan American Games
Medalists at the 2015 Parapan American Games
Medalists at the World Para Swimming Championships
Swimmers at the 2016 Summer Paralympics
Swimmers at the 2020 Summer Paralympics
Medalists at the 2020 Summer Paralympics
Paralympic medalists in swimming
Paralympic silver medalists for Argentina
Sportspeople from Rosario, Santa Fe
S8-classified Paralympic swimmers